The 1972 John Player League was the fourth competing of what was generally known as the Sunday League.  The competition was won for the first time by Kent County Cricket Club.

Standings

Batting averages

Bowling averages

See also
 Sunday League

References

John Player
Pro40